__notoc__

 

In geometry, the isogonal conjugate of a point  with respect to a triangle  is constructed by reflecting the lines  about the angle bisectors of  respectively. (This definition applies only to points not on a sideline of triangle .) This is a direct result of the trigonometric form of Ceva's theorem.

The isogonal conjugate of the incentre  is itself. The isogonal conjugate of the orthocentre  is the circumcentre . The isogonal conjugate of the centroid  is (by definition) the symmedian point . The isogonal conjugates of the Fermat points are the isodynamic points and vice versa. The Brocard points are isogonal conjugates of each other.

The set  of triangle centers under the trilinear product, defined by 

 

As isogonal conjugation is a function, it makes sense to speak of the isogonal conjugate of sets of points, such as lines and circles.  For example, the isogonal conjugate of a line is a circumconic; specifically, an ellipse, parabola, or hyperbola according as the line intersects the circumcircle in 0, 1, or 2 points.  The isogonal conjugate of the circumcircle is the line at infinity.  Several well-known cubics (e.g., Thompson cubic, Darboux cubic, Neuberg cubic) are self-isogonal-conjugate, in the sense that if  is on the cubic, then  is also on the cubic.

Another construction for the isogonal conjugate of a point

See also 
 Isotomic conjugate
 Central line (geometry)
 Triangle center

References

External links

 Interactive Java Applet illustrating isogonal conjugate and its properties
MathWorld
 Pedal Triangle and Isogonal Conjugacy

Triangle geometry